George Christopher was the 34th Mayor of San Francisco.

George Christopher may also refer to:

 George Christopher (actor) (born 1970), British actor
 George Christopher Molesworth Birdwood (1832–1917), Anglo-Indian official and writer
 George H. Christopher (1888–1959), American Democratic politician from Missouri
 George Christopher, a character on the TV series Bored to Death

See also
 Chris George (disambiguation)